The Uganda Film Festival Award for Best Feature Film is an award presented annually by Uganda Communications Commission (UCC) at the Uganda Film Festival Awards. Introduced in 2013 at the inception of the Uganda Film Festival Awards, the award is given in honor of a producer who has exhibited outstanding production for a feature film.

Winners and nominees
The table shows the winners and nominees for the Best Feature Film award.

Multiple wins and nominations
The following individuals have won multiple Best Feature film awards:

The following producers have received two or more Best Feature Film nominations

Records
 In 2016, Nisha Kalema was the first female producer whose film (Veronica's Wish) was nominated for the award, and became the first female producer to win the award with the same film that same year.

References

Ugandan film awards